Aino Pervik (born 22 April 1932 in Rakvere) is an Estonian children's writer, and translator.

She is "considered the bravest children's writer" in contemporary Estonia, as "she takes on difficult themes of immigration, cultural conflict, corruption, and the loss of cultural identity".

Life and career 
Pervik began her schooling at Järvakandi Factories in 1939, continued in 1946–1950 in Tallinn, and graduated from Tartu State University in 1955 with a degree in Finno-Ugric philology. Pervik has lived in Tallinn since 1955. She worked at the Estonian State Publishing House as an editor of children’s and young-adult literature, and at the Eesti Televisioon (ETV) studio as an editor of programs for the same age group. Since 1967, she has been a freelance writer and translator from Hungarian.

Personal 
Aino Pervik was married to writer Eno Raud who died in 1996; their children are scholar and author Rein Raud, musician and writer Mihkel Raud and children's writer and illustrator Piret Raud.

Bibliography 

 NummiPealt ja mujalt (From BonnyHead and Beyond), Tänapäev 2018
 Sinivant joonistab (Bluephant Draws), Tammerraamat 2017
 Tähenärija raamatukogu (Starchewer’s Library), Petrone Print 2017
 Hädaoru kuningas (The King of the Walley of Woes), Tänapäev 2016
 Sinivant kuulab unejuttu (Bluephant Hears a Bedtime Story), Tammerraamat 2016
 Jääpurikas, murelik piim ja teised tüübid (The Icicle, the Worried Milk, and Other Things), Tänapäev 2015
 Tähenärija ja Kriksadull (Starchewer and Cricksadull), Tänapäev 2015
 Härra Tee ja proua Kohv, Tänapäev 2014
 Roosaliisa prillid (Roosaliisa’s New Glasses), Päike ja Pilv 2014
 Sinivant läheb lasteaeda (Bluephant Goes to Preschool), Tammerraamat 2014
 Jänes keedab suppi (Rabbit Makes Soup), Päike ja Pilv 2013
 Väike valge pilvelammas, kes läks läbi vikerkaare (The Little White Cloud-Sheep Who Passed Through a Rainbow), Päike ja Pilv 2013
 Kirjatähtede keerukas elu (The Complex World of Letters), Tänapäev 2012
 Klabautermanni mure (Klabautermann’s Problem), Tänapäev 2012
 Rändav kassiemme (The Wandering Cat), Tammerraamat 2012

Series Tirilinn

 Aiapidu roosiaias (Garden Party in the Rose Garden), Tammerraamat 2009
 Krokodill (Crocodile), Tammerraamat 2009
 Kui sa näed korstnapühkijat (When You See a Chimney Sweep), Tammerraamat 2009
 Tirilinnas algab kool (School Starts in Tirilinn), Tammerraamat 2009
 Piknik Ristineemel (A Picnic at Ristineeme), Tammerraamat 2010
 Jüri soolaleivapidu (Jüri’s Housewarming Party), Tammerraamat 2011
 Isegi Max ei usu enam (Even Max No Longer Believes), Tammerraamat 2012
 Ühes väikses veidras linnas (In an Odd Little Town), Tänapäev 2009
 Presidendilood (Stories of a President), Tänapäev 2008, rev. ed. 2013
 Suleline, Puhuja ja must munk (Feathered, Blower, and the Black Monk), Tänapäev 2007
 Dixi ja Xixi (Dixi and Xixi), Ilo 2005
 Draakonid võõrsil (The Dragons in a Foreign Land), Tiritamm 2002
 Mammutilaps ajab tuult taga (The Little Mammoth Catches the Wind), Avita 2002

Series Paula’s Life

 Paula lõpetab lasteaia (Paula Finishes Kindergarten), Tiritamm 2001, 2007
 Paula läheb linna elama (Paula Moves to the City), Tiritamm 2001, 2007
 Paula esimene koolipäev (Paula’s First Day of School), Tiritamm 2001, 2007
 Paula ja Joosep (Paula and Joseph), Tiritamm 2001
 Paula jõulud (Paula’s Christmas), Tiritamm 2001, 2007
 Paula ja õuelapsed (Paula and the Neighborhood Kids), Tiritamm 2002
 Paula õpib emakeelt (Paula Learns Her Mother Tongue), Tiritamm 2003
 Paula ja Patrik (Paula and Patrick), Tiritamm 2002
 Paula käib poes (Paula Goes to the Store), Tiritamm 2003
 Paula läheb piknikule (Paula Goes on a Picnic), Tiritamm 2003
 Paula viiakse haiglasse (Paula is Taken to the Hospital), Tiritamm 2003
 Paula päästab Kassiopeiat (Paula Saves Cassiopeia), Tiritamm 2003
 Paula läheb külla (Paula Goes on a Visit), Tiritamm 2005
 Paula raamatukogus (Paula at the Library), Tiritamm 2005
 Paula lumememm (Paula’s Snowman), Tiritamm 2005
 Paula aabits (Paula’s Book of ABCs), Tiritamm 2007
 Paula sõidab kevadet vaatama (Paula Goes to See Spring), Tiritamm 2008
 Maailm Sulelise ja Karvasega (The World with Feathered and Furry), Varrak 2000
 Keeruline lugu, Tiritamm 1994
 Kallis härra Q (Dear Mr. Q), Kupar 1992, illustrated by Edgar Valter; Avita 2004, Tänapäev, 2016
 Sookoll ja sisalik (Bog Bogey and Lizard), Eesti Raamat 1986, Tiritamm 2004
 Arabella, mereröövli tütar (Arabella, the Pirate’s Daughter), Eesti Raamat 1982, Tiritamm 2000, Tänapäev 2008, 2013, 2015
 Kunksmoor ja kapten Trumm (Old Mother Kunks and Captain Trumm), Eesti Raamat 1975, Tammerraamat 2011
 Kunksmoor (Old Mother Kunks), Eesti Raamat 1973, Tammerraamat 2011
 Kaarist on kasu (Kaari is a Helper), Eesti Raamat 1971, 1972, TEA Kirjastus 2010
 Õhupall (The Balloon), Eesti Raamat 1969

Awards 

 2006–2012, 2018 Astrid Lindgren Memorial Award candidate
 2018 Good Children’s Book (From BonnyHead and Beyond)
 2017 National Lifetime Achievement Award for Culture
 2016 Annual Children’s Literature Award of the Cultural Endowment of Estonia (The King of the Walley of Woes)
 2015 Jānis Baltvilks Prize (Jāņa Baltvilka balva), Latvia (Stories of a President)
 2014 Hans Christian Andersen Award nominee
 2014 Good Children’s Book (Bluephant Goes to Preschool)
 2014 “Järje Hoidja” Award of the Tallinn Central Library (Härra Tee ja Proua Kohvi)
 2012 Annual Award of the Cultural Endowment of Estonia (The Complex World of Letters, Klabautermann’s Problem, The Wandering Cat)
 2012 Good Children’s Book (Klabautermann’s Problem)
 2010 Estonian Children’s Literature Centre Raisin of the Year Award(In an Odd Little Town)
 2008 “Järje Hoidja” Award of the Tallinn Central Library (Paula Goes to See Spring)
 2006 J. Oro Prize for Children’s Literature
 2004 Nukits Competition, 3rd place (The “Paula” series: Paula Finishes Kindergarten, Paula Moves to the City, Paula’s First Day of School, Paula and Joseph, Paula’s Christmas)
 2004 IBBY Honour List (Paula Learns Her Mother Tongue)
 2001 Republic of Estonia Order of the White Star, Fifth Class
 2001 Annual Children’s Literature Award of the Cultural Endowment of Estonia (the “Paula” series)
 2000 Winning book of “Hundred of the Century” poll (Old Mother Kunks, Old Mother Kunks and Captain Trumm)
 1993 Annual Estonian Writer’s Union Prize (Dear Mr. Q and play Bog Bogey and Lizard)
 1988 USSR Children’s Book Competition, 2nd place (Old Mother Kunks, Old Mother Kunks and Captain Trumm)
 1976 Juhan Smuul Annual Prize of Literature (Old Mother Kunks and Captain Trumm)

Translations 
Arabella, the Pirate’s Daughter

 Russian: Арабелла – дочь пирата, Vene Entsüklopeedia 2001, Tänapäev 2011
 Vietnamese: A-ra-ben-la: con gai tên cuop bîen, Kim Dông, 1999
 Latvian: Arabella, jūras laupītāja meita, Sprīdītis 1994
 Czech: Aranella, dcera piráta, Lidove Nakldatelsstvi 1988
 Finnish: Arabella, merirosvon tytär, WSOY 1987
 English: Arabella, the Pirate’s Daughter, Perioodika 1985, new translation Tänapäev 2011
 German: Arabella die Piratentochter, Perioodika 1985; German: Leiv 2012

Bog Bogey and Lizard

 English : Bog Bogey and Lizard, Perioodika 1988

Kaari is a Helper

 Russian: Каари помогает маме, Eesti Raamat 1975

Klabautermann’s Problem

 Russian: Морские приключения и заботы корабельного гнома Клабаутермана, Издательство КПД 2014

Old Mother Kunks

 Azerbaijani: Гянджлик 1982
 Russian: Баба-Мора, Eesti Raamat 1977, 1982
 Finnish: Konkkamuori, WSOY 1975

Old Mother Kunks and Captain Trumm

 Russian: Баба-Мора и капитан Трумм, Eesti Raamat 1983
 Finnish: Konkkamuori ja kapteeni Trummi, WSOY 1978

Old Mother Kunks + Old Mother Kunks and Captain Trumm

 Russian: Баба-Мора, Tammerraamat 2014
 German: Die Kunksmuhme, LeiV 2012
 Japanese: 1991
 Russian: Чаромора, Детская литература 1988
 English: Old Mother Kunks, Perioodika 1986
 German: Die Kunksmuhme, Perioodika 1979, 1981, 1984

Paula and Patrik

 Lithuanian: Paula ir Patrikas, Nieko rimto 2008

Paula and Patrik + Paula and the Neighborhood Kids + Paula Goes to the Store + Paula Goes on a Picnic + Paula is Taken to the Hospital

 Russian: Паула: продолжение, Aleksandra 2013

Paula Finishes Kindergarten

 Lithuanian: Paula baigia vaikų darželį, Nieko rimto 2008
 Russian : Паула: выпускной в детскoм садy, Aleksandra 2007

Paula Moves to the City + Paula and Joosep + Paula’s First Day of School + Paula’s Christmas

 Russian: Паула, Aleksandra 2011

Stories of a President

 Latvian: Prezidents, Liels un mazs 2015
 Russian: Как работать президентом, КПД 2013
 Bulgarian: Приключенията на президента, Gaiana 2009

The Balloon

 Latvian: Gaisa baloninš, Liesma 1972
 Lithuanian: Balionėlis, Vagos 1972

The Wandering Cat

 Italian: La gatta vagabonda, Sinnos 2014

The World with Feathered and Furry

 Russian: Мир с Пернатой и Мохнатым, Vene Entsüklopeedia 2004

References 

1932 births
Living people
Estonian children's writers
Estonian women children's writers
Estonian translators
University of Tartu alumni
20th-century Estonian women writers
21st-century Estonian women writers
People from Rakvere
Recipients of the Order of the White Star, 5th Class